Tijan Jaiteh (born 31 December 1988) is a Gambian footballer for Al-Markhiya.

He was captain of Gambia's international youth team for a number of years. And is currently the captain of the senior national team
Appointed as good will ambassador of The Gambia 
Tijan Jaiteh is accorded full diplomatic status “

Club career
In 2005, Jaiteh, along with three of his countrymen, came to Bergen on a trial for the Norwegian Premier League club SK Brann. The club secured exclusive rights to buy all four of the young Gambians. In October 2006 it became clear that only Jaiteh passed the bar, and he joined SK Brann in January 2007. He won the Norwegian Premier League with Brann the same year.

31 January 2011 he was loaned out to Randers until the end of 2011, but he had his loan cut short after disappearing from the club in August.

On 18 March 2012 he signed a one-year contract with Sandefjord. On 5 February 2019 it was confirmed, that Jaiteh had signed a one-year contract with FK Partizani Tirana.

International

Jaiteh competed in the 2007 African Youth Championship where Gambia finished third and got qualified for the 2007 FIFA U-20 World Cup.  Jaiteh was part of Gambian U-20 team at both tournaments, and Gambia ended knocked out by Austria in the Round of 16 at U-20 World cup.

References

External links

1988 births
Living people
Gambian footballers
The Gambia youth international footballers
The Gambia international footballers
Association football midfielders
SK Brann players
Randers FC players
Sandefjord Fotball players
FC Koper players
Kuopion Palloseura players
Bnei Yehuda Tel Aviv F.C. players
Al-Markhiya SC players
FK Partizani Tirana players
Eliteserien players
Danish Superliga players
Slovenian PrvaLiga players
Israeli Premier League players
Qatar Stars League players
Kategoria Superiore players
Gambian expatriate footballers
Expatriate footballers in Norway
Expatriate men's footballers in Denmark
Expatriate footballers in Slovenia
Expatriate footballers in Israel
Expatriate footballers in Qatar
Expatriate footballers in Albania
Gambian expatriate sportspeople in Norway
Gambian expatriate sportspeople in Denmark
Gambian expatriate sportspeople in Israel
Gambian expatriate sportspeople in Qatar